{{DISPLAYTITLE:C16H13N3O3}}
The molecular formula C16H13N3O3 (molar mass: 295.29 g/mol, exact mass: 295.0957 u) may refer to:

 Nimetazepam
 Mebendazole (MBZ)

Molecular formulas